An electronic visual display, informally a screen, is a display device for presentation of images, text, or video transmitted electronically, without producing a permanent record.  Electronic visual displays include television sets, computer monitors, and digital signage. By the above definition, an overhead projector (along with screen onto which the text, images, or video is projected) could reasonably be considered an electronic visual display since it is a display device for the presentation of an images, plain text, or video transmitted electronically without producing a permanent record. They are also ubiquitous in mobile computing applications like tablet computers, smartphones, and information appliances.

From the mid-2000s through to the early 2020s, flat-panel displays dominated the industry, as cathode-ray tubes (CRT) were phased out, especially for computer applications, and curved panels were not yet developed.

Types 
These are the technologies used to create the various displays in use today.
 Electroluminescent (EL) display
 Liquid crystal (LC) display with Light-emitting diode (LED)-backlit Liquid crystal (LC) display
 Light-emitting diode (LED) display
OLED display
AMOLED display
 Plasma (P) display
 Quantum dot (QD) display

Additionally, CRTs were widely used in the past and microLED displays are under development.

Classification

Electronic visual displays present visual information according to the electrical input signal (analog or digital) either by emitting light (then they are called active displays) or, alternatively, by modulating available light during the process of reflection or transmission (light modulators are called passive displays).

Display mode of observation

Electronic visual displays can be observed directly (direct view display) or the displayed information can be projected to a screen (transmissive or reflective screen). This usually happens with smaller displays at a certain magnification.

A different kind of projection display is the class of "laser projection displays", where the image is built up sequentially either via line by line scanning or by writing one complete column at a time. For that purpose one beam is formed from three lasers operating at the primary colors, and this beam is scanned electro-mechanically (galvanometer scanner, micro-mirror array)) or electro-acousto-optically.

Layout of picture elements

Depending on the shape and on the arrangement of the picture elements of a display, either fixed information can be displayed (symbols, signs), simple numerals (7-segment layout) or arbitrary shapes can be formed (dot-matrix displays).

Emission and control of colors

Colors can be generated by selective emission, by selective absorption, transmission or by selective reflection.

Addressing modes
Each sub-pixel of a display device must be selected (addressed) in order to be energized in a controlled way.

Display driving modes

See also 
 Display device
 ISO 13406-2

References

 SID - Society for Information Display International Conference Proceedings 1970–2008
 Journal of the Society for Information Display (JSID)
 Display Reparatur (in German)
 Passive Displays
 Choosing an IT device

Further reading
 Pochi Yeh, Claire Gu: "Optics of Liquid Crystal Displays", John Wiley & Sons 1999, 4.5. Conoscopy, pp. 139

Display devices

fi:Tietokonenäyttö